Mission Selfie was a BBC Three reality travel series, starring Ben Brown and Steve Booker. The hosts' goal was to "take a photograph that sums up the experience." Filming locations included Dubai, Isle of Mull, Iceland, Berlin and El Hiero. Episodes ranged from 13–17 minutes in length. The series premiered on BBC iPlayer on 19 August 2016.

References

BBC reality television shows
2016 British television series debuts